Lavar-e Saheli (also Romanized as Lāvar-e Sāḩelī; also known as Lāvar and Lāvar Kabkān) is a village in Kabgan Rural District, Kaki District, Dashti County, Bushehr Province, Iran. At the 2006 census, its population was 437, in 117 families.

References 

Populated places in Dashti County